Craig Stephen Morgan (born 26 September 1978) is a Welsh former professional rugby union footballer who played as wing. A product of the Pontypridd RFC youth academy, he played professionally for Cardiff RFC and the Cardiff Blues. He earned 10 caps for Wales between 2002 and 2005, scoring three tries.

Morgan signed for Bristol from Cardiff Blues in 2008. He returned to Cardiff RFC in 2008, where he played for two years before joining Merthyr RFC.

References

External links
 Cardiff profile
 Bristol profile
 statistics from scrum.com
 Wales profile

1978 births
Living people
Welsh rugby union players
Rugby union wings
Bristol Bears players
Wales international rugby union players